The 1971 Asian Weightlifting Championships were held at the auditorium of the Far Eastern University in Manila, Philippines between October 9 and October 11, 1971. Weightlifters from seven countries Iran, Israel, South Korea, Philippines, Australia (as guest nation), Indonesia and Taiwan competed in the tournament.

Medal summary

Medal table

References
1st Day Results
2nd Day Results
3rd Day Results

Asian Weightlifting Championships
Asian
Weight
International weightlifting competitions hosted by the Philippines